Guarani d'Oeste is a municipality in the state of São Paulo in Brazil. The population is 1,998 (2020 est.) in an area of 85.7 km2. The elevation is 499 m.

References

Municipalities in São Paulo (state)